Osvaldo Dionisio Vargas Gómez (born 10 October 1957) is a Chilean former footballer who played as a centre-back. Besides Chile, he played in Argentina, Ecuador and Venezuela.

Club career
As a youth player, Vargas was with Independiente from Papudo and then he joined Unión La Calera in the Chilean second level. In his homeland, he had an extensive career playing for clubs such as O'Higgins, Deportes Valdivia, Deportes Concepción, among others.

Abroad, he played for Gimnasia La Plata in Argentina, Filanbanco in Ecuador and Minervén in Venezuela.

His last club was Deportes Puerto Montt in 1993.

International career
Vargas represented Chile at under-20 level in the 1979 South American Championship.

At senior level, he made three appearances for the Chile national team in friendly matches between 1980 and 1981 and scored one goal against Argentina.

Personal life
He is better known by his nickname Papudo Vargas.

Post-retirement
Vargas started and manages a football academy called "Escuela de Fútbol Osvaldo Papudo Vargas" in his city of birth.

He also has worked in the sports area of the municipalities of both Lampa and Papudo as a football coach for children.

References

External links
 
 
 Osvaldo Vargas at MemoriaWanderers.cl 

1957 births
Living people
People from Petorca Province
Chilean footballers
Chilean expatriate footballers
Chile under-20 international footballers
Chile international footballers
Primera B de Chile players
Unión La Calera footballers
Puerto Montt footballers
Chilean Primera División players
O'Higgins F.C. footballers
Unión Española footballers
Rangers de Talca footballers
Deportes Valdivia footballers
Deportes Concepción (Chile) footballers
Santiago Wanderers footballers
C.D. Antofagasta footballers
Argentine Primera División players
Club de Gimnasia y Esgrima La Plata footballers
Ecuadorian Serie A players

Venezuelan Primera División players
Minervén S.C. players
Chilean expatriate sportspeople in Argentina
Chilean expatriate sportspeople in Ecuador
Chilean expatriate sportspeople in Venezuela
Expatriate footballers in Argentina
Expatriate footballers in Ecuador
Expatriate footballers in Venezuela
Association football defenders